is a town in Oshima Subprefecture, Hokkaido, Japan.

As of September 2016, the town's population was estimated as 17,299, with a density of 18 persons per km2. The total area is 955.98 km2.

On October 1, 2005, the town of Kumaishi was merged into Yakumo; now in the newly created Futami District. The former town of Kumaishi joined Oshima Subprefecture at the same time.

Geography
Yakumo is the only municipality which faces both the Sea of Japan and the Pacific Ocean. The Yakumo area and the Kumaishi area are separated by mountains.

The name comes from the word "Yakumo" in the Waka composed by Susanoo-no-Mikoto.

Neighboring municipalities
 Oshima Subprefecture
 Oshamanbe
 Mori
 Hiyama Subprefecture
 Otobe
 Setana
 Imakane
 Assabu

Climate

History
1881: The village of Yakumo was founded in Yamakosi District.
1902:
 Yakumo village and Yamakoshinai village were merged to form the new village of Yakumo.
 Kumaishi village was founded in Nishi District, Hiyama Subprefecture.
1919: Yakumo village became Yakumo town.
1957: Otoshibe village in Kayabe District was merged into Yakumo town.
1962: Kumaishi village became Kumaishi town.
2005: Yakumo town and Kumaishi town was merged to form new town of Yakumo in Futami District. (Because of it, Hiyama Subprefecture was divided between north and south.)

Education
 High schools
 Hokkaido Yakumo High School
 Hokkaido Kumaishi High School

Transportation
 Hakodate Main Line: Otoshibe - Nodaoi - Yamakoshi - Yakumo - Washinosu - Yamasaki - Kuroiwa
 Hokkaido Expressway: Yakumo IC - Yakumo PA - Otoshibe IC
 Route 5

Sister city
 Komaki, Aichi

Notable people from Yakumo
Goro Ibuki, actor
Yukari Konishi, sport shooter
Masahiro Kobayashi, actor

References

External links

Official Website 

 
Towns in Hokkaido